The unscientific moth genus name Blepharum refers to the genus Catocala.

Blepharum is a genus of beetles in the family Buprestidae, containing the following species:

 Blepharum bivittatum Kerremans, 1891
 Blepharum coeruleipes Fairmaire, 1878
 Blepharum leopardum Fisher, 1930
 Blepharum nigrum Thomson, 1878
 Blepharum sainvali (Bily, 2000)

References

Buprestidae genera